Adolfo Ramón Jara Heyn (born 29 December 1965) is a former football midfielder, futsal player, and coach.

Career
Heyn played for most his career in Olimpia Asunción where he won several national and international championships such as the Copa Libertadores and Supercopa Sudamericana. His brother, Luis, also played alongside him in Olimpia for eight years. Heyn also played a few games for the Paraguay national football team during his career, including the U-20 FIFA World Cup of 1985. He also had a brief stint in futsal and represented the Paraguay national futsal team in the 1989 FIFA Futsal World Cup.

After retiring from football as a player he became a coach and was part of the Olimpia coaching staff during the 2007 season.

Titles

As player

External links
.

References

Paraguayan footballers
Club Olimpia footballers
Paraguay international footballers
Paraguayan football managers
Paraguayan men's futsal players
Living people
1964 births
Association football midfielders